The Letta government was the 62nd government of the Italian Republic. In office from 28 April 2013 to 22 January 2014, it comprised ministers of the Democratic Party (PD), The People of Freedom (PdL), Civic Choice (SC), the Union of the Centre (UdC), one of the Italian Radicals (RI) and three non-party independents.

The government was referred to by journalists as a Grand coalition or Government of broad agreements. At formation, the government benefited from a supermajority in the Italian Parliament, one of the largest in the history of the Italian Republic. It was the youngest government to date, with a median age of 53. It was sworn in on 28 April 2013 and won the confidence vote in both the Chamber of Deputies on 29 April and the Senate on 30 April.

Formation and end 

The 2013 general election, held on 24–25 February, saw the rise of the Five Star Movement (M5S) and the lack of a common majority in both houses of Parliament. More specifically, the centre-left coalition (Italy. Common Good) was ahead of the centre-right coalition, but controlled a majority only in the Chamber of Deputies. The election was followed by weeks of deadlock, including various failed attempts either to elect a President to succeed Giorgio Napolitano and form a government, the establishment of a panel of experts by the President himself (the so-called "wise men") in order to outline priorities and formulate an agenda to deal with the persistent economic hardship and growing unemployment, and, ultimately, the resignation of Pier Luigi Bersani from secretary of the Democratic Party (PD).

On 22 April 2013 Napolitano, after being re-elected for an unprecedented second term, immediately started consultations. Two days later, the President gave Enrico Letta, deputy-secretary of the PD, the task of forming a government, having determined that Bersani could not. Letta succeeded Mario Monti, who had resigned on 21 December 2012, but whose government remained in charge for ordinary administration until 28 April 2013, the day the new government was sworn in. During the ceremony, a man fired shots outside Palazzo Chigi and wounded two Carabinieri. The cabinet was composed mainly by four parties: the PD, The People of Freedom (PdL), Civic Choice (SC) and the Union of the Centre (UdC). The fact that the new Prime Minister was a nephew of Gianni Letta, one of the most trusted advisors to Silvio Berlusconi, the leader of the PdL, was perceived as a way of overcoming the bitter hostility between the two opposing camps.

However, on 28 September, Berlusconi asked his party's five ministers to resign from the government over a tax hike. On 15 November 2013, Berlusconi, who would be soon stripped of his seat in the Senate with PD's votes due to his conviction for tax fraud, announced the re-foundation of Forza Italia (FI), in opposition to the government, and the PdL split. In fact, all five PdL ministers, led by Deputy Prime Minister and Minister of the Interior Angelino Alfano, joined the New Centre-Right (NCD) party. The same week, also SC suffered a split, with its minister Mario Mauro leaving the party, founding the Populars for Italy (PpI) and, nevertheless, keeping his post.

The Letta government lasted until 22 February 2014 (for a total of 300 days). The government fell apart after the PD retired its support. Since December 2013 the party had been led by Matteo Renzi, the 39-year-old mayor of Florence nicknamed "the scrapper". Renzi succeeded Letta and formed the Renzi government.

Investiture votes

Party breakdown

Beginning of term

Ministers

Ministers and other members
 Democratic Party (PD): Prime minister, 9 ministers, 5 deputy ministers, 12 undersecretaries
 The People of Freedom (PdL): 5 ministers, 2 deputy ministers, 10 undersecretaries
 Independents: 3 ministers, 2 deputy ministers, 5 undersecretaries
 Civic Choice (SC): 2 ministers, 1 deputy minister, 2 undersecretaries
 Union of the Centre (UdC): 1 minister, 1 undersecretary
 Italian Radicals (RI): 1 minister
 Great South (GS): 1 undersecretary
 Moderates in Revolution (MiR): 1 undersecretary

End of term

Ministers

Ministers and other members
 Democratic Party (PD): Prime minister, 8 ministers, 4 deputy ministers, 12 undersecretaries
 New Centre-Right (NCD): 4 ministers, 1 deputy minister, 7 undersecretaries
 Independents: 3 ministers, 2 deputy ministers, 5 undersecretaries
 Civic Choice (SC): 1 minister, 1 deputy minister, 1 undersecretary
 Populars for Italy (PpI): 1 minister, 1 undersecretary
 Union of the Centre (UdC): 1 minister, 1 undersecretary
 Italian Radicals (RI): 1 minister

Council of Ministers

Composition

References

External links

 
2013 establishments in Italy
2014 disestablishments in Italy
Cabinets established in 2013
Cabinets disestablished in 2014
Italian governments
Grand coalition governments